Mario Eduardo Dorsonville-Rodríguez (born October 31, 1960) is a Colombian-born American prelate of the Roman Catholic Church. He has been serving as an auxiliary bishop of the Archdiocese of Washington (covering Washington D.C. and parts of Maryland) since 2015.

Biography

Early life 
Mario Eduardo Dorsonville-Rodríguez was born  on October 31, 1960, in Bogotá, Colombia to Carlos Dorsonville and Leonor Rodríguez.  He studied for the priesthood at Theological Seminary of Bogotá where he received a bachelor's degrees in philosophy (1981) and sacred theology (1985).

Priesthood 
On November 23, 1985, Dorsonville was ordained a priest by Cardinal Mario Bravo for the Archdiocese of Bogotá.After his ordination, Dorsonville served as associate pastor at Immaculate Heart of Mary Parish in Bogotá until 1986, then as chaplain of the National University of Colombia until 1987.  That same year, he was appointed pastor of San Jose de Calasanz Parish in Bogotá. Dorsonville received the additional duties of associate chaplain and professor of ethics at National University. He completed a Licentiate in Sacred Theology from the Pontifical Xavierian University in Bogotá in 1991.

In 1992, Dorsonville moved to Washington D.C. to study at the Catholic University of America. While studying at Catholic University, he served as associate pastor at Good Shepherd Parish in Alexandria, Virginia, and Christ the Redeemer Parish in Sterling, Virginia.  He also lectured at the Inter-American Development Bank in Washington and at the Hispanic Apostolate of Arlington. 

Dorsonville interrupted his academic studies to return to Colombia in 1995.  For one year, he served as chaplain and professor of business ethics at National University and professor of pastoral counseling and catechesis at the Major Seminary for the archdiocese.  

In 1996, Dorsonville moved back to Washington to complete his Doctor of Ministry degree from Catholic University of America. He was assigned in 1997 as associate pastor of Our Lady of Lourdes Parish in Bethesda, Maryland.  Deciding to live permanently in the United States, Dorsonville was incardinated, or transferred, in 1999 from the Archdiocese of Bogotá to the Archdiocese of Washington.

Dorsonville was moved in 2004 to become assistant pastor of St. Mark the Evangelist Parish in Hyattsville, Maryland.  In 2005, he was appointed vice president for mission of the Catholic Charities of Washington and director of the Spanish Catholic Center. Dorsonville completed an executive certificate in non-profit management at Georgetown University in Washington in 2009.  An additional responsibility was added in 2011 with his appointment as adjunct spiritual director of St. John Paul II Seminary in Washington.   Dorsonville also served on board of directors for Carroll Publishing Company (2000-2003), member of the priest council (2000-2015), mentor for newly ordained priests (2010-2011) and membership in the college of consultors (2011-2015).

Auxiliary Bishop of Washington 
On March 20, 2015, Pope Francis named Dorsonville as the titular bishop of Kearney and as an auxiliary bishop for the Archdiocese of  Washington.  His episcopal consecration took place on April 20, 2015 at the Cathedral of St. Matthew in Washington, D.C.  He was consecrated by Cardinal Donald Wuerl, with Cardinal Óscar Rodríguez Maradiaga and Archbishop William Lori as co-consecrators.

On February 29, 2020, Dorsonville addressed a hearing on refugees by the Subcommittee on Immigration and Citizenship at the US House of Representatives.  He made these remarks:Today I am here to echo the Holy Father’s message: to recognize that we must at all times, but particularly at this moment of great global turmoil, recognize the most vulnerable and welcome them to the extent we are able.Dorsonville released a statement on August 20, 2021, calling on the Biden Administration to address the refugee influx created by the Taliban takeover of Afghanistan that month.  On September 29, 2021, during a homily, Dorsonville asked parishioners to become actively involved in helping Afghan refugees.

Bishop of Houma–Thibodaux 
On February 1, 2023, Pope Francis appointed him as bishop of Houma–Thibodaux. He is scheduled to be installed on March 29, 2023.

See also

 Catholic Church hierarchy
 Catholic Church in the United States
 Historical list of the Catholic bishops of the United States
 List of Catholic bishops of the United States
 Lists of patriarchs, archbishops, and bishops

References

External links

 Roman Catholic Archdiocese of Washington Official Site

1960 births
Living people
Clergy from Bogotá
Catholic University of America alumni
21st-century American Roman Catholic titular bishops
Roman Catholic Archdiocese of Washington
Roman Catholic bishops in Washington, D.C.
Colombian people of Spanish descent
Colombian people of English descent
Major Seminary of Bogotá alumni
Academic staff of the Major Seminary of Bogotá
Bishops appointed by Pope Francis